Fitzsimons (also spelled FitzSimons, Fitzsimmons or FitzSimmons) is a surname of Norman origin common in both Ireland and England. The name is a variant of "Sigmundsson", meaning son of Sigmund. The Gaelicisation of this surname is Mac Shíomóin.

The name "FitzSymons" and its pre-standardization variants (Fitzsimons, Fitzsimmons, Fitz-Simons, etc.) is not a sept, or clan, name, but rather an individual patronymic passed down through various, yet discrete, colonial families arriving at different times in Irish history. Some families "went native" during the Gaelic revival of the 14th and 15th centuries, and many refused to endorse the Protestant Reformation. Others became important members of the Protestant Ascendancy and its supporting mittelstand. Two distinct families can be identified: those who arrived when the surname was first recorded in Ireland in 1177, attached to an adventurer seeking swordlands in Ulster, known as Sir John de Courcy of Carrickfergus Castle, earl of Ulster. These Fitzsimons are now native to the east-central seaboard of Ulster, in Lecale, Ards and Down.

In 1323, a junior member of the Fitzsymons' of Simonshide, Herefordshire, settled in Dublin. This family is thought to be distinct from the Ulster Fitzsimons. Settling in Dublin, and the north and south reaches of Dublin County, they expanded into Meath, Westmeath, King's and Queen's County of the central English Pale. This branch may have been the root of the Wexford Fitzsimons family which produced a Signer of the Declaration of Independence (or the Wexford family may have sprung from a Norman adventurer arriving with Strongbow). Of the Pale Fitzsimons, it is thought discrete branches settled at Tullynally, County Meath, the line of Sir William Johnson and 'went' native by intermarrying with the O'Reillys and MacMahons of south central Ulster. These are generally the families now with ties to County Cavan and County Longford.

The English family which sent its youngest son to Dublin in 1323 died out in the name, only the Irish branch now survives. The name "Fitzsimons" is quite common in England itself. These originating in Norfolk, Lincolnshire and Nottinghamshire are thought to be Scandinavian and of the genere Danus, as the area was settled by Danish Vikings and predate the Norman invasion in 1066 AD.

People surnamed Fitzsimons or Fitzsimmons
 Allan Fitzsimmons (f. 1980s-2000s), United States civil servant
 Arthur Fitzsimons (born 1929), Irish athlete in football
 Casey FitzSimmons (born 1980), United States athlete in football
 Charles Fitzsimmons (1802–1876), Australian politician and sugar farmer, Member of the Queensland Legislative Assembly (1860–1861, 1865–1868)
 Charles B. Fitzsimons (1924–2001), Irish American actor
 Conor Fitzsimmons (born 1998), British rugby league footballer
 Lowell "Cotton" Fitzsimmons (1931–2004), United States basketball coach
 David Fitzsimons (born 1950), Australian Olympic athlete
 David Fitzsimmons (1875 – ?), Scottish athlete in football
 David FitzSimmons (born 1978), American politician, member of the Minnesota House of Representatives (2013–2015)
 Eoghan Fitzsimons, Irish Attorney General (1994) and barrister
 Foster Fitzsimmons (f. 1930s – 1960s), United States dancer, novelist and teacher
 Frank Fitzsimmons (1907–1981), United States labor leader
 Freddie Fitzsimmons (1901–1979), United States athlete in baseball
 Frederick William FitzSimons (1870–1951), South African naturalist
 George Fitzsimmons (public servant) (1858–1933), Australian letter server
 George Fitzsimmons (serial killer) (1937–1999), American serial killer
 George Kinzie Fitzsimons (1928–2013), American Roman Catholic bishop
 Gerry Fitzsimons (1960–2007), British businessman
 Greg Fitzsimmons (born 1966), United States comedian and writer
 Herbert FitzSimons (1898–1970), Australian politician, Member of the New South Wales Legislative Assembly (1930–1944) and Council (1955–1970)
 James E. Fitzsimmons (1874–1966), United States racehorse trainer
 Jason Fitzsimmons (born 1971), Canadian athlete in ice hockey
 Jeanette Fitzsimons (born 1945), New Zealand politician and environmentalist
 James Fitzsimmons (1870–1948), Canadian politician, member of the Legislative Assembly of British Columbia (1928–1933)
 Jim Fitzsimons (born 1936), Irish politician
 John Fitzsimons (footballer) (1915–1995), Scottish footballer for Alloa, Falkirk and Clyde, doctor with Celtic
 John FitzSimons (born 1943), English javelin thrower
 John Fitzsimmons (1939–2008), Scottish clergyman and broadcaster
 Lesley Fitz-Simons (1961–2013), Scottish actress
 Lorna Fitzsimons (born 1967), British politician
 Matthew Fitzsimmons (born 1913), English football centre half who played for Liverpool
 Maureen O'Hara (born Maureen FitzSimons; 1920-2015), Irish-American actress
 Maurice J. Fitzsimons, Jr. (1906-1972), American politician
 Michael Fitzsimons (born 1989), Irish Gaelic footballer who plays for Cuala and Dublin
 Orla Fitzsimons (born 1981), Irish rugby union player
 Pat Fitzsimons (born 1950), United States athlete in golf
 Paul Fitzsimons, Irish Gaelic footballer 
 Peter FitzSimons (born 1961), Australian rugby union player, journalist, author
 Randy Fitzsimmons (f. 1990s), Swedish musician
 Richard W. Fitzsimons (1922-1991), American farmer and politician
 Riley Fitzsimmons (born 1996), Australian Olympic sprint canoeist
 Robert Fitzsimmons, several people:
 Robert James "Bob" Fitzsimmons (1863–1918), British boxer and three division champion
 Robert Stanley "Bob" Fitzsimmons (1917–1998), Australian rules footballer who played for Fitzroy and St Kilda
 Robert J. "Rocky" Fitzsimmons (born 1979), American attorney and politician, member of the West Virginia Senate (2012–014)
 Ronald J. Fitzsimmons (f. 1980s-2000s), United States lobbyist
 Ross Fitzsimons (born 1994), English footballer
 Roy Fitzsimmons (1916–1945), United States explorer
 Shane Fitzsimmons (f. 2000s), Australian fire commissioner
 Shane Fitzsimmons (footballer) (born 1955), Australian rules footballer who played for Melbourne and for West Perth
 Sharyn Hill (née Fitzsimmons; born 1954), Australian cricket player
 Stephen Fitzsimons (1882–1952), Irish Gaelic footballer
 Steve Fitzsimmons (born 1976), Australian athlete in football
 Stuart Fitzsimmons (1956–2019), British Olympic alpine skier
 Thomas Fitzsimons (1741–1811), American merchant and statesman. Signed U.S. Constitution.
 Tom Fitzsimmons (1890–1971), United States athlete in baseball
 Tom Fitzsimmons (actor) (born 1947), American television actor
 Tommy Fitzsimmons (1870 – ?), Scottish athlete in football
 Vivian Frederick Maynard FitzSimons (1901–1975), South African herpetologist
 Whitney Fitzsimmons, Australian journalist
 William Fitzsimmons (disambiguation), any of several men with variations of that name

Places with the name
 Fitzsimmons Creek, a large creek in Whistler, British Columbia, Canada
 Fitzsimmons Range, a mountain range in southwestern British Columbia, Canada
 FitzSimons Wood, a forest in Dún Laoghaire–Rathdown, County Dublin, Ireland
 The Young Men's Leadership School at Thomas FitzSimons High School

Fictional characters
 Jimmy Fitzsimmons, character in the American animated series F Is for Family
 "Fitzsimmons", the "ship" name for the fictional characters Leo Fitz and Jemma Simmons in the series Agents of S.H.I.E.L.D.

References

English-language surnames
Patronymic surnames